Blahodatne is a selo in Zolotonosha Raion, Cherkasy Oblast, Ukraine. It belongs to Zolotonosha urban hromada, one of the hromadas of Ukraine. Blahodatne has a population of 3,331.

History 
The first mention of the village which was called Bogushkovo settlement refers to 1619. In the XVII century the village was the center of Cossack infantry of Kropivnitskogo and subsequently Pereyaslav regiments. The Cossacks of Bogushkova Slobodka participated in the national liberation war of the middle of the 17th century, and in 1666 the village became the center of the  uprising of the Pereyaslavsky regiment.

At the end of the XVIII century, the village had 285 yards with a population of 850 inhabitants, and already 737 yards with 3907 inhabitants at the beginning of the XX century. There were 3 blacksmiths, 34 mills, 4 creameries, and several shops.

In 1920, during the Civil War while returning from the Polish front the regiments of the 25th Chapayev division stopped in the village for a short rest. This became the basis for renaming the village to Chapayevka in 1923.

In 1929, the kolkhoz was formed named after Chapayev. In the 1930s, a typical high school building was built, a 400-seat House of Culture and a House of Pioneers were opened.

On June 7, 1936, the first rural stadium in the republic for 5 thousand spectators was inaugurated where all-Ukrainian sports competitions among rural athletes took place.

On 21 May 2016, Verkhovna Rada adopted decision to rename Chapaievka to Blahodatne according to the law prohibiting names of Communist origin.

References

External links
 Chapaievka at the Verkhovna Rada of Ukraine site

1619 establishments in Ukraine
Villages in Zolotonosha Raion